The first season of the American television series Legends of Tomorrow, which is based on characters from DC Comics, premiered on The CW on January 21, 2016, and ran for 16 episodes until May 19, 2016. The season follows a group of heroes and villains who are called to travel through time in order to fight a greater threat. It is set in the Arrowverse, sharing continuity with the other television series of the universe, and is a spin-off of both Arrow and The Flash. The season is produced by Berlanti Productions, Warner Bros. Television, and DC Entertainment, with Phil Klemmer and Chris Fedak serving as showrunners.

The season was ordered in May 2015, and filming began that August. Arthur Darvill headlines the season as Rip Hunter, with principal cast members Victor Garber, Brandon Routh, Caity Lotz, Franz Drameh, Ciara Renée, Falk Hentschel, Amy Pemberton, Dominic Purcell, and Wentworth Miller also starring. The season was followed by a second season.

Episodes

Cast and characters

Main 
 Victor Garber as Martin Stein / Firestorm
 Brandon Routh as Ray Palmer / Atom
 Arthur Darvill as Rip Hunter
 Caity Lotz as Sara Lance / White Canary
 Franz Drameh as Jefferson "Jax" Jackson / Firestorm
 Ciara Renée as Kendra Saunders / Hawkgirl
 Falk Hentschel as Carter Hall / Hawkman
 Amy Pemberton as Gideon
 Dominic Purcell as Mick Rory / Heat Wave
 Wentworth Miller as Leonard Snart / Captain Cold

Recurring 
 Casper Crump as Vandal Savage
 Alex Duncan as Miranda Coburn 
 Martin Donovan as Zaman Druce

Guest

Production

Development 
In January 2015, co-creator Greg Berlanti stated that there were "very early" preliminary talks for an additional spin-off series centered on Ray Palmer / Atom (Brandon Routh), from Arrow and The Flash. In February 2015, it was reported that a spin-off series, described as a superhero team-up show, was in discussion by The CW for a possible 2015–16 midseason release. Berlanti, Andrew Kreisberg, Marc Guggenheim, and Sarah Schechter would serve as executive producers. The potential series would be headlined by several recurring characters from both Arrow and The Flash, including Palmer, Leonard Snart (Wentworth Miller), and Martin Stein (Victor Garber). Caity Lotz was also mentioned to be among the main cast. There would be potential for other Arrow/Flash characters to cross over to the new series, and the series would be casting "three major DC Comics characters who have never appeared in a TV series".

In March 2015, Stephen Amell, who portrays Oliver Queen / Green Arrow on Arrow, confirmed the series would air in the 2015–16 midseason. Additionally, Kreisberg stated more would be revealed about the nature of the series by the end of Arrows third season, specifically why Lotz is slated to appear, given her previous character, Sara, was killed at the start of Arrow season three. Berlanti also stated there was a particular reason for the other half of Firestorm—Ronnie Raymond (Robbie Amell), as seen on The Flash—not being mentioned in the initial cast announcement. On the purpose of the series, Berlanti said it was designed to be "most similar to our crossover episodes, where you feel that 'event-iness', but all the time. For us, first and foremost, with all of [our shows], it's about 'how is it its own thing?' Because we don't just want to do it to do it." He also revealed the producers were focusing on "making sure that the villain that we have on [the] show is distinct too... another big character who hasn't been used yet." Also in March, Dominic Purcell was revealed to be reprising his role as Heat Wave in the series, and Blake Neely, composer of Arrow and The Flash, would serve as composer. At the end of the month, Arthur Darvill was cast as Rip Hunter, while Ciara Renée was cast as Kendra Saunders / Hawkgirl. In April 2015, in a Variety article on the recent MipTV event, it noted the title for the series would be Legends of Tomorrow, despite it still being unconfirmed by those involved with the series. Also in the month, Franz Drameh was cast as Jefferson Jackson. Keiynan Lonsdale, who would eventually play Wally West / Kid Flash as a regular in the third season, had originally auditioned for this role. Amy Pemberton was chosen to voice Gideon, the artificial intelligence of the Waverider.

In May 2015, Garber said that The CW was impressed with what was shown to them, giving the project a straight-to-series order. The network officially confirmed the order for the series on May 7, 2015, as well as the official title, DC's Legends of Tomorrow. Later in the month, it was confirmed that Lotz would reprise her role as Sara Lance, who would be taking the name White Canary, as well as revealing the antagonist as Vandal Savage. In June 2015, it was announced that Phil Klemmer had been made the series showrunner as well as executive producer; Chris Fedak serves as executive producer and co-showrunner with Klemmer. In August 2015, Casper Crump was cast as Savage, and Falk Hentschel as Carter Hall / Hawkman. Although initially advertised as a regular cast member, Hentschel was credited as a guest star for his appearances in episodes airing after the season's second episode. In January 2016, Martin Donovan was cast as Rip Hunter's mentor Zaman Druce, a Time Master.

Filming 
In May 2015, Garber revealed filming would begin in August 2015, for a January 2016 premiere. The series shot a presentation for the network's upfront showcase, which was filmed over the course of one night, and directed by Arrow and The Flash veteran Dermott Downs. Filming of the series began on September 9, 2015, in Vancouver, British Columbia. Director/producer Glen Winter discussed in a January 2016 interview with Comic Book Resources the process of filming key elements of the series' pilot,
The new facet for Legends was that there's no #1 [actor] on the call sheet. There are seven or eight leads. For me, that was the intimidating part. I wasn't as worried about the action and tone as I was with wrangling all these personalities and finding out how they all work together. Or, how to shoot a scene with eight people in the Waverider, day after day. He stated of the series style of shooting on location as opposed to predominantly shooting on a soundstage,
As is typical with any pilot, most of the time you are going to shoot more on location. Because you don't necessarily know if you are going to have a show that's been picked up, they don't want to invest a lot of money in the infrastructure, so you end up shooting more on location. The only set that was built was the Waverider. That being said, because we knew there was a pickup for the show, it wasn't a conventional pilot. All the resources of construction went into the Waverider. That's continuing into the series. I don't think they tend to build much. I think they tend to adapt locations because there's so much time travel and so many eras to create.

Release

Broadcast 
The season began airing on January 21, 2016 on The CW in the United States, and concluded on May 19, 2016. The series premiere was prefaced with a special airing on January 19, 2016, titled "DC's Legends of Tomorrow: Their Time Is Now". It featured the origin stories of the heroes and villains of the season, as well as show clips and interviews. The series premiere in Australia was originally announced as January 20, 2016, however it was pushed back until January 22. It started airing in the United Kingdom on March 3, 2016.

Home media 
The season was released on Blu-ray on August 23, 2016.

Reception

Ratings

Critical response 
The pilot was well reviewed for its potential. Russ Burlingame from ComicBook.com praised it saying, "The series delivers a sharp, enjoyable pilot that's arguably the most attention-grabbing and entertaining from any of the current crop of superhero shows." Jesse Schedeen of IGN gave the first part of the pilot episode a 7.7/10, praising the show's "epic scope", "fun character dynamics", and Arthur Darvill's performance; and gave the second part of the pilot an 8.4/10, saying it "improved in its sophomore episode thanks to great character dynamics and superhero action". However, review aggregation website Rotten Tomatoes gave the complete season only a 65% approval rating, with an average rating of 6.42/10 based on 36 reviews. The website's consensus reads: "Fancy effects, comic-book nostalgia, and an alluring cast help keep it afloat, but DC's Legends of Tomorrow suffers from an overloaded cast of characters that contribute to a distractingly crowded canvas." Metacritic, which uses a weighted average, assigned a score of 58 out of 100 based on reviews from 22 critics, indicating "mixed or average reviews".

Reviewing the season as a whole, Schedeen said, "It's interesting to see where Legends of Tomorrow ended its first season in relation to where it started. Early on, the show's plodding pace caused it to lag behind The Flash and Arrow. But the show eventually found its voice and managed to end on a stronger note than either of its sister series. Even in those weeks where the pointless romantic drama or the conflict with Vandal Savage failed to inspire much excitement, the memorable character dynamics made this show a joy to watch." J. C. Macek III of PopMatters said, "While not without its flaws, Legends of Tomorrow is just too good to ignore. There are big surprises in every episode, but the biggest surprise is that the first season actually is a really good show."

Accolades 

|-
! scope="col" rowspan="6" | 2016
| Saturn Awards
| Best Superhero Adaption Television Series
| Legends of Tomorrow
| 
| 
|-
| rowspan="5" | The Joey Awards
| Young Actor in a TV Series Featured Role 6–10 Years
| Glen Gordon
| 
| 
|-
| rowspan="3" | Young Actor in an Action TV Series Guest Starring/Principal Role
| Aiden Longworth
| 
| 
|-
| Cory Gruter-Andrew
| 
| 
|-
| Mitchell Kummen
| 
| 
|-
| Young Actor in a TV Series Recurring Role 6–9 Years
| Kiefer O'Reilly
| 
| 
|}

Notes

References

General references

External links 
 
 

2016 American television seasons
Legends of Tomorrow seasons